Richmond South Centre is a provincial electoral district for the Legislative Assembly of British Columbia, Canada that was created in the 2015 redistribution from parts of Richmond Centre, Richmond East and Richmond-Steveston. It was first contested in the 2017 election.

Demographics

History
This riding has elected the following Members of Legislative Assembly:

Election results

Student vote results 
Student Vote Canada is a non-partisan program in Canada that holds mock elections in elementary and high schools alongside general elections (with the same candidates and same electoral system).

External links 
Hi-Res Map (pdf)

References

British Columbia provincial electoral districts
Politics of Richmond, British Columbia
Provincial electoral districts in Greater Vancouver and the Fraser Valley